Qara Bagh is a town and the center of Qarabagh District, Kabul Province, Afghanistan. The population is 13,000 (2007 calculation). The town was seriously damaged during the wars.

See also 
Qarabagh District
Kabul Province

References 

Populated places in Kabul Province